Melaleuca sapientes is a plant in the myrtle family, Myrtaceae, endemic to the south-west of Western Australia. It is a small shrub with silky grey leaves and small heads of pinkish flowers in spring or early summer. The attractive, silvery foliage has made this melaleuca a popular garden plant under the incorrect name of Melaleuca holosericea, a similar but much rarer species.

Description

The flowers are a shade of pink or purple, arranged in heads on the ends of branches which continue to grow after flowering and sometimes also in the upper leaf axils. The outer surface of the flower cup (the hypanthium) is silky-hairy. Five bundles of stamens are seen around the flower, each with seven to nine stamens.

Taxonomy and naming
The specific epithet (sapientes) honours Rob and Ann Smart, farmers near Jerramungup, for their assistance with research into the Melaleuca genus. Sapientes is derived from the Latin word sapiens meaning "wise", hence "Smart".

Distribution and habitat
This melaleuca occurs in and between the Jerramungup, Hyden, Salmon Gums, and Ponier Rock districts in the Coolgardie, Esperance Plains and Mallee biogeographic regions. It grows in gravel, sandy clay, or loam on slopes.

Conservation
Melaleuca sapientes is listed as "not threatened" by the Government of Western Australia Department of Parks and Wildlife.

Use in horticulture
This species of melaleuca has been cultivated as Melaleuca holosericea, mainly because of its attractive, silvery foliage. It grows well in a range of soils.

Gallery

References

sapientes
Myrtales of Australia
Plants described in 1999
Rosids of Western Australia
Endemic flora of Western Australia
Taxa named by Lyndley Craven